Newton is a town centre of the city in Surrey, British Columbia. It is the location for the previous Surrey City Hall and Courthouse, a local Surrey Public Library branch, and a Kwantlen Polytechnic University campus. The studios of radio station Red FM are also located here.

History 
Newton is named after settler Elias John Newton (January 29, 1841 – August 1, 1907), a saddler and harness-maker, who settled in the area in 1886 after being raised in Richmond, Ottawa, Ontario. His real name was Villeneuve (which translates to "New Town" from French), but surrounded by anglophone neighbours, he translated his last name to its English equivalent.   The BC Electric Railway stimulated Newton’s growth and helped to establish the corner of 72 Avenue and King George Boulevard as a Town Centre.

Geography

For planning purposes, the City of Surrey generally considers Newton's borders to be: 120 Street on the west; Colebrook Road to the south, and 152 Street to the east. The northern boundary varies between 80 and 88 avenues.

To the south of Newton is Boundary Bay; the northern portion of it is called Mud Bay, also the name of a park and the lands adjacent to it.

Newton sits roughly 100 meters (318 feet) above sea level. Newton has a land area of roughly 48.69 km² (18.80 mi²)

Demographics
Newton has the largest population of all the city's town centres, as well as the most ethnically diverse population; over half of the population is ethnically South Asian (predominantly Punjabi). As of 2016, the population of Newton stands at 149,040.

Surrounding town centres

See also
Surrey-Newton provincial electoral district
Surrey-Panorama Ridge provincial electoral district
Newton-North Delta federal electoral district

Notes

External links
City of Surrey website

Neighbourhoods in Surrey, British Columbia